The Democratic Republic of the Congo national under-18 basketball team represents the Democratic Republic of the Congo in international basketball competitions. It is controlled by the Basketball Federation of Democratic Republic of Congo. and represents the country in international under-18 (under age 18) basketball competitions.

See also
DR Congo men's national basketball team
DR Congo men's national under-16 basketball team
DR Congo women's national under-19 basketball team

External links
DRC Basketball
Africabasket – DR Congo Men National Team U18/19
DR Congo Basketball Records at FIBA Archive
Presentation on Facebook

References

Men's national under-18 basketball teams
Basketball
Basketball
1963 establishments in the Republic of the Congo (Léopoldville)